655321  was the prisoner number of Alex, the main character from Stanley Kubrick's film adaptation of A Clockwork Orange.  In the original book, by Anthony Burgess, the prisoner number was 6655321.

It may also refer to:
 The prisoner number of Plankton in the episode "Jailbreak" from the cartoon SpongeBob SquarePants.
 The prisoner number of Zorak in the episode "Time Machine" in the cartoon The Brak Show.
 A song on the album We're Already Gone by The Beautiful Girls.
 The employee number of Nolan Sorrento, a character in the novel Ready Player One.
 The candidate reference number of Skeletor in The First Purge.
 A song by Brazilian technopop act Tek Noir.